Gabrielle "Gaby" Solis is a fictional character portrayed by Eva Longoria on the ABC television series Desperate Housewives. Longoria was nominated for a Golden Globe Award for Best Actress – Television Series Musical or Comedy for her performance.

Storylines

Past
Gabrielle Márquez was born in Las Colinas, Texas. Her family is from Guadalajara, Mexico. Born on December 8, 1976, she has a brother and a sister. Her father died of cancer when she was five years old. From that point on, her mother, Lucía Márquez (María Conchita Alonso), married Alejandro Perez (Tony Plana) who sexually abused Gabrielle throughout her teenage years. According to Gabrielle, her mother overlooked the matter, and a nun at her school refused to believe her claims of having been raped. When she was fifteen, Gabrielle ran away to New York City to pursue a career in modeling. Gabrielle achieved significant success but earned a reputation for being difficult. As her career began to fade, she married wealthy businessman Carlos Solis (Ricardo Antonio Chavira), who proposed after only three dates. They then relocated to Wisteria Lane in the fictional suburb of Fairview, Eagle State, where Gabrielle befriended Susan Mayer (Teri Hatcher), Lynette Scavo (Felicity Huffman), Bree Van de Kamp (Marcia Cross), and Mary Alice Young (Brenda Strong).

Season 1 
In the pilot episode, Gabrielle is unhappy with her marriage to Carlos, whose priority is work. She is shown to be extremely lonely while Carlos is money-minded and oblivious to her unhappiness. To keep herself entertained, she has an affair with John Rowland (Jesse Metcalfe), her teenage gardener. Carlos suspects that Gabrielle is being unfaithful and he enlists the help of his mother, Juanita "Mama" Solis (Lupe Ontiveros). Mama Solis catches Gabrielle and John having sex and takes a photograph to document Gabrielle's betrayal. However, while fleeing the house, she is hit by a car driven by Andrew Van de Kamp, and Gabrielle is able to dispose of the evidence against her. Mama Solis falls into a coma as a result of the accident and dies a few months later without having the opportunity to tell Carlos about Gabrielle's affair. Gabrielle and John end the affair after his mother Helen (Kathryn Harrold) and Susan discover it. Soon after, Carlos is arrested for importing goods made by slave labor. The government freezes the Solis' bank accounts, forcing Gabrielle to perform low-wage modeling jobs to pay bills. Carlos is eventually released under house arrest while awaiting trial, during which time the couple faces several financial crises.

Carlos continually asks Gabrielle for a child, as well as a post-nuptial agreement that she will not divorce him while he is in jail. After Carlos physically forces Gabrielle to sign the documents, she reignites her affair with John. Later, Gabrielle discovers that she is pregnant and is unsure of who the father is. John hopes to help take care of the baby, but Gabrielle tells him she will only acknowledge Carlos as the father. Later, Gabrielle finds out that Carlos had tampered with her birth control in order to orchestrate her pregnancy. While Carlos is facing a separate trial for assaulting two different gay men he mistook for being Gabrielle's lovers (the first being a cable repairman who slipped in their bathroom after interrupting a tryst between Gabrielle and John, the second being John's roommate Justin), John admits to his affair with Gabrielle.  Carlos attempts to attack John in court, and is subsequently convicted for hate crimes.

Season 2 
With Carlos now in jail and a child on the way, Gabrielle alienates John and attempts to salvage her marriage. Gabrielle and Carlos continue sparring until she apologizes for the affair wholeheartedly for the first time. Hoping to be granted a conjugal visit and eventually get Carlos released on parole, Gabrielle hires David Bradley (Adrian Pasdar), a womanizing lawyer who later professes his love to Gabrielle, to get Carlos' hate crime conviction overturned. Later, Caleb Applewhite (Page Kennedy), Betty Applewhite's (Alfre Woodard) allegedly violent and mentally ill son, breaks into Gabrielle's home and chases her. She falls down the stairs, resulting in a miscarriage. Afterwards, Carlos is paroled thanks to the influence of a nun named Sister Mary Bernard (Melinda Page Hamilton). Gabrielle objects to Carlos' attempts to become a better and more spiritual man, as it threatens her lavish lifestyle, thus prompting Sister Mary to suggest Carlos annul his marriage to Gabrielle. Gabrielle intervenes when Carlos attempts to accompany Sister Mary on a charity trip to Botswana. To rid herself of Sister Mary permanently, Gabrielle tells a priest at the church that Sister Mary and Carlos had an affair. Consequently, Sister Mary is transferred to Alaska.

Gabrielle agrees to have a child with Carlos, but her miscarriage leads to complications, forcing them to consider adoption. They prepare to adopt the unborn baby of pole dancer Libby Collins (Nichole Hiltz). However, Libby's boyfriend, Frank Helm (Eddie McClintock), and his teenaged brother and the baby's father, Dale (Sam Horrigan), try to intervene. When the baby, Lily, is born, a judge grants Carlos and Gabrielle temporary custody; however, Libby ultimately decides to take Lily back and raise her with Frank. Meanwhile, Gabrielle learns that her maid, Xiao-Mei (Gwendoline Yeo), is in danger of being deported to China. Xiao-Mei agrees to be Gabrielle and Carlos' surrogate in order to stay in the country. As the pregnancy progresses, Gabrielle suspects that Carlos and Xiao-Mei are having an affair. When she catches them having sex, she kicks Carlos out of the house and informs Xiao-Mei that she is not allowed to leave until the baby is born.

Season 3
The third season opens six months later, near the end of Xiao-Mei's pregnancy and in the midst of Gabrielle and Carlos' divorce proceedings. When Xiao-Mei gives birth, doctors discover that they had accidentally switched the Solis' embryo with another couple's and the Solis' embryo was not successfully inseminated. Xiao-Mei moves out and Gabrielle and Carlos are left without a child. Despite this, their divorce proceedings become complicated and vindictive. Following Gabrielle's divorce, she teams up with her personal shopper Vern (Alec Mapa) to coach a group of young misfit girls for the Little Miss Snowflake Beauty Pageant. She briefly dates Bill Pearce (Mark Deklin) the widowed father of a girl in the pageant, before realizing that she is not yet ready to date again. Soon after, Zach Young (Cody Kasch) the recently wealthy son of Gabrielle's deceased friend, Mary Alice, begins pursuing Gabrielle. Though Gabrielle refuses to date him, she agrees to befriend the irresponsible and disturbed Zach. When Zach proposes to Gabrielle at the grand opening of the Scavos' new pizzeria, she rejects him and terminates their friendship.

Later, Victor Lang (John Slattery), a candidate for the mayor of Fairview, takes notice of Gabrielle, and arranges an encounter with her by having his chauffeur intentionally rear-end her car with his limo. They date casually, but Gabrielle insists that she is not interested. Nevertheless, they have mutual feelings of love. When Gabrielle learns that Carlos has started dating her neighbor, the promiscuous Edie Britt (Nicollette Sheridan), she accepts Victor's marriage proposal. As the wedding draws near, Gabrielle begins to have second thoughts about marrying Victor, especially after he wins the election and neglects her for his political career. Despite this, she marries Victor. However, after the wedding, Gabrielle overhears a conversation Victor has with his father Milton (Mike Farrell), where he admits to only having married her for his political gain, thus; prompting her to reignite her relationship with Carlos.

Season 4 
The season premiere, "Now You Know", opens with Gaby and Carlos' plan to run away together on Gaby's wedding night; however, after Edie stages a suicide attempt, Carlos calls off the plan. One month later, Gaby and Carlos reignite their affair despite their commitments to Victor and Edie, respectively. Edie soon becomes suspicious of Carlos, and eventually pieces together that he is cheating on her with Gabrielle when she, Carlos, and Victor all come down with crabs. She hires a private investigator, who photographs the couple sharing a final kiss after having just decided to end their affair. Edie shows the photographs to Victor. Victor takes Gabrielle on his boat, where she learns that he has found about the affair. Fearing that he might try to kill her, she knocks him overboard twice (first by herself and then with Carlos' help) and leaves him at sea. Victor survives the ordeal and vows to get revenge on Gabrielle and Carlos. He attempts to kill Carlos during a tornado, only to be killed when he is impaled from behind by a fencepost. In the same storm, Carlos is blinded while the only documents giving him access to an offshore bank account are destroyed. The couple remarries soon after.

While Gabrielle learns to cope with Carlos' blindness, the Solises rent out a room in their house to Ellie Leonard (Justine Bateman) to improve their financial circumstances. Gabrielle later discovers that Ellie is a drug dealer and alerts the authorities; however, after she and Ellie bond, Gabrielle helps her escape before the police arrest her. Gabrielle later discovers several thousand dollars in Ellie's abandoned belongings. Ellie comes back to retrieve it, but Gabrielle tries to keep it from her. When police arrive to the Solis home, Ellie escapes and seeks refuge in Katherine Mayfair's house, where she is shot and killed by Wayne Davis (Gary Cole).

Season 5 
Five years after the events in season four, Gabrielle is not as beautiful, Carlos is still blind, and they are now raising two disobedient daughters, Juanita (Madison De La Garza) and Celia (Daniella Baltodano). The family struggles financially, forcing Carlos to take a job as a masseur at a local country club, which further alienates them from high society. One of Carlos' elderly and wealthy clients, Virginia Hildebrand (Frances Conroy), offers him a job as her personal masseur. Virginia becomes close with the Solises. Initially, Gabrielle does not mind, as she enjoys the luxuries Virginia provides for them; however, she starts to feel uncomfortable. Virginia revises her will to make the Solises the sole heirs to her estate, but Gabrielle eventually rejects the offer when Virginia tries to make important decisions in Juanita and Celia's lives. Later, Carlos regains his sight after having surgery.

Carlos plans to take a job at the community center to help blind people. Tired of struggling, Gabrielle forces Carlos to take a high-salary office job. Meanwhile, Gabrielle works to lose weight and return to her model figure. When Gabrielle discovers that Carlos' new boss, Bradley Scott (David Starzyk), is cheating on his wife, she promises to remain silent so long as Carlos receives a generous salary bonus. Eventually, Bradley's wife, Maria Scott (Ion Overman), finds out about his affair and kills him. As a result of Bradley's death, Carlos is promoted. Later, Gabrielle hesitantly agrees to take in Carlos' teenage niece, Ana (Maiara Walsh), when her grandmother can no longer care for her. Gabrielle attempts to foster a positive relationship with Ana; however, she soon sees how entitled and manipulative Ana is.

Season 6 
Gabrielle's relationship with Ana becomes more problematic, as Ana shows no regard for the household rules. Ana begins pursuing Danny Bolen (Beau Mirchoff), the teenage son of their new neighbors, Angie (Drea de Matteo) and Nick Bolen (Jeffrey Nordling). When Danny is accused of strangling Susan's daughter, Julie Mayer (Andrea Bowen), Ana attempts to provide him a false alibi until Gabrielle forces her to tell the truth. Later, Ana gets a job at John Rowland's restaurant. John attempts to win Gabrielle back, forcing her to question whether or not she still has feelings for him. She ultimately decides that she is happy with her life, and Ana quits her job after Gabrielle confesses to her affair with John in the first season. Gabrielle also begins experiencing difficulties in her relationship with Juanita: her poor parenting skills make other parents reluctant to let their children play with Juanita; Gabrielle's hot temper gets Juanita expelled from school; and her attempts to home school Juanita only strain their relationship further. Gabrielle and Carlos then enroll Juanita in private school. Later, Gabrielle discovers that Lynette has been hiding her pregnancy in order to secure a promotion at Carlos' company. Feeling betrayed, Gabrielle ends their friendship and Carlos tries to drive Lynette to quit her job. However, when a small plane hired by Karl Mayer makes a crash landing on Wisteria Lane, Lynette saves Celia from its path, thus restoring her friendship with Gabrielle.

Gabrielle's friendship with Angie is complicated when Ana and Danny begin dating, especially when Gabrielle and Carlos discover that the Bolens are keeping a dangerous secret. To break up Ana and Danny, Gabrielle and Carlos send her to a modeling academy in New York; unbeknownst to them or the Bolens, however, Danny follows her there. Gabrielle accompanies Angie to New York to retrieve Danny, during which time she learns about Angie's mysterious past, which involves Danny's biological father. Patrick Logan (John Barrowman), an environmental terrorist and Danny's real father, tracks them down to Wisteria Lane. He runs over Nick, placing him in the hospital, and holds Angie and Danny hostage. Gabrielle helps rescue the Bolens and send them to Atlanta, as the government is still searching for them due to their involvement in Patrick's terrorism.

Season 7
Gabrielle is told the truth of Andrew killing Carlos' mother but decides to keep it quiet, fearing Carlos' reaction and not wanting to hurt him.

She is sent to the hospital after Bree accidentally hits Juanita with her car. She finds out later that Juanita is not her real daughter due to a hospital mixup.

However, Gabrielle soon realizes she wants to meet her true daughter and convinces a lawyer to find the other family. Carlos is angered when he finds out, telling her that the family could take Juanita away and if that happens, he'll never forgive Gabrielle. When they meet the family, they automatically know that Grace is Gaby's daughter as she is throwing a fit over a jumper. Gabrielle grows closer to Grace, causing jealousy in Juanita, who doesn't know the truth. When Grace's legal parents are discovered to be illegal immigrants, her legal father Hector is arrested and her legal mother Carmen is forced to go on the run. Since Grace was born in the United States, she is a citizen and Gabrielle and Carlos agree to take her in to raise her.

To make sure they can get Grace to live with them, Gabrielle turns Grace's legal mother into U.S. Immigration and Customs Enforcement (ICE) but then has second thoughts when ICE shows up, posing as Carmen and letting Carmen get away. But when Gabrielle and Carlos go to pick up Grace, Carmen insists on taking Grace.

Distraught over losing Grace, Gabrielle confides in Lynette, the only person she knows who has lost a child. Lynette tells Gabrielle that she wrote a letter to the child she lost, and that this might help Gabrielle, who wouldn't have to actually send it. Gabrielle writes the letter; Juanita finds it and runs away, hiding in the back of Bob and Lee's car, where Gabrielle sees her just in time for her to be rescued during the riot. A therapist suggests that Carlos and Gabrielle cut off all ties and reminders of Grace in order to let the tension with Juanita heal. Gabrielle is reluctant, keeping photos of Grace but Carlos demands she do this for Juanita.

Gabrielle seems to agree, but goes to a boutique and buys a doll that resembles Grace and keeps it hidden from her family. After Juanita and Celia find it and play with it, ultimately breaking its arm, Gabrielle goes back to the boutique and has the owner repair "Princess Valerie". The owner promises to repair it, and Gabrielle, feeling she is too attached to the doll, asks the owner if she thinks Gabrielle is strange. The owner disagrees, and shows Gabrielle her own doll, Mrs. Humphreys. The owner tells Gabrielle that she fell in love with the doll and bought it, ultimately learning the doll's "story". The owner says that Mrs. Humphreys is a music teacher whose sister died around the same time the owner's did (hinting that the owner bought the doll as a replacement for her passed on sister, much as Gabrielle did). Gabrielle sees the owner's pain, and the owner asks Gabrielle about Princess Valerie's story. Although reluctant, Gabrielle emotionally tells her that the doll was a princess who was accidentally given to the wrong family, but she found her way back eventually, and her mother, the Queen, had her hid so that no one could take her away again. When she gets home, Gabrielle puts Princess Valerie in a box behind her closet. Carlos finds out about Gabrielle's obsession with the doll so they go out to get rid of it and get carjacked by an unknown gunman. Gabrielle tries to take Princess Valerie out of the car but she had to let her go because the gunman threatened to kill her.

Carlos insists she go to therapy but she ignores it, going to spa treatments instead. Eventually, Carlos goes with her as she confesses to the therapist how she was molested as a child. At the therapist's suggestion, Gabrielle and Carlos go to her hometown where Gaby is surprised to learn she is a celebrity. She enjoys being admired by the townspeople until she meets the nun she had once confided in about her abuse as a child. The nun had then refused to believe Gabrielle's story and remains stubborn as Gabrielle lets out the shame she has long since been forced to feel by the cold nun's words; passing it back onto this woman who was in a position to prevent a childhood of torment and failed to do anything, gives Gaby the sense of closure she has been seeking. Finally Gabrielle tells Carlos she is ready to go home and leave the past behind.

Making amends for his past while in AA, Andrew decides to tell Carlos about running over his mother. While Carlos does forgive Andrew, he is furious with Gabrielle over keeping the secret from him. He tells Bree that he won't forgive her for hiding the truth and bans Gabrielle from seeing Bree again. Gabrielle takes her girls and temporarily moves in with Bree. She shortly returns to Carlos.

Gabrielle shows a horror movie to Juanita, which gives her nightmares. She claims that a man is standing on the family's front lawn every night. Gabrielle is doubtful of this until she too notices the mysterious stranger. She sees him while shopping one day and asks a security officer to see a security camera. She realizes that her stalker is the stepfather who raped her as a child. This horrifies Gabrielle, especially because she thought that he was dead.

Gabrielle learns her stepfather has been following her everywhere she goes. She drives to a deserted area when she knows he is following her, and walks into a clearing, armed with a gun that she acquired for her protection. She confronts him about raping her as a young girl. He admits to the terrible deed.

During Susan's coming home dinner, Gabrielle runs home to begin preparations for dessert course. Once she enters her house, her stepfather confronts her again, pretending to have her gun. He begins to attack her and attempts to rape her. However, Carlos comes home and intervenes, accidentally killing him with a blow to the head from a candlestick. Bree, Susan, and Lynette come into the house and discover the body. With help from Bree, they are able to clean up before the rest of the guests arrive. The group agrees to keep the situation secret.

Season 8

Gabrielle and Carlos deal with keeping the murder of her stepfather quiet, Carlos unable to be intimate due to his guilt. Gabrielle challenges the antagonistic PTA head at Juanita's school after a parking dispute only to accidentally hit the woman with her car. The woman gets revenge by making Gabrielle her replacement, warning her that being PTA head will drive Gabrielle crazy. The first meeting does not go well as Gabrielle is late due to a spa appointment and the other members berate her over putting her high-living lifestyle over her responsibilities. Assuming they're jealous, Gabrielle gives them massages and makeovers but they still refuse to help. They snap that Gabrielle has no idea how people like them live and her life is so perfect. However, when a drunken Carlos comes in, the PTA members realize that Gabrielle faces many struggles as well and she really isn't that different from them after all. They take over the luncheon project and allow Gabrielle to help her husband. When Carlos gets drunk before work, Gabrielle attempts to cover for him but his boss figures it out. Rather than be upset, the man tells Carlos he understands, being a recovering alcoholic himself, and urges Carlos to get help. Carlos checks himself into a rehab center but vanishes the same night detective Chuck Vance is killed, making Gabrielle worry Carlos might have done it while drunk. When a guilty Susan checks in on Alejandro's family, his suspicious widow, Claudia, follows her, believing Susan is having an affair with her husband. Gabrielle is upset with Susan until she hears Susan's suspicion that Claudia's daughter, Marisa, was also molested. Gabrielle invites Claudia over, telling her the truth about Alejandro. Claudia refuses to believe it until Marisa finally confesses what the man did to her, Claudia distraught to have had her daughter hurt like that. She later comes to Gabrielle, thanking her for letting her see the truth. She spots the rug stained with Alejandro's blood that Gabrielle was having replaced and tells Gabrielle to get rid of it, clearly knowing what happened to Alejandro and willing to keep it quiet.

When Carlos gets out of rehab, he surprises Gabrielle by having a new attitude of giving away money, not wanting to be so greedy anymore. Gabrielle is upset at first but at Mike's funeral, realizes it's better to let Carlos do what makes him happy. She tries to calm her nerves by shopping and ends up being offered a job as a "personal shopper." At first, Gabrielle is good with it but also has to pretend to be single to win over male shoppers. Carlos is upset with this and Gabrielle tells him she is doing what she wants and is enjoying it. When Bree is put on trial for killing Alejandro, both Carlos and Gabrielle want to tell the truth but Karen McCluskey (overhearing them talking about it) confesses on the stand to killing Alejandro herself. Gabrielle is eventually offered a promotion at her job with Carlos upset at first but coming to accept it. In the final moments of the series, it's stated that Carlos helps Gabrielle start her own online shopper company, which earns her a show on the Home Shopping Network. They eventually move to a mansion in Los Angeles where "they argued happily ever after."

Trivia 
 Roselyn Sánchez auditioned for the role also but the producers thought she wasn't right for the role because of her heavy Puerto Rican accent. Sánchez did make a cameo in the series finale as the new gardener Carlos hires for their house and became a main character in the spin-off series Devious Maids as Carmen Luna.
 Laura Harring also auditioned for the role of Gabrielle.
 When Marc Cherry was casting, he asked Eva, "Do you like the script?" She said, "not meaning to be conceited, but I only read my part," then he thought "she's Gaby."
Gabrielle is one of two housewives to cheat on their husbands with the other being Bree.
Gabrielle is the youngest of the housewives from the main four, but Angie is the youngest housewife from all ten. 
 Gabrielle is allergic to lilies, likes to dance salsa and drink merlot.
Gabrielle and Carlos have O+ blood group.
 Gabrielle is the only main housewife to not have a stepchild:
 Zach Young is Susan's stepson. 
 Kayla Huntington Scavo is Lynette's stepdaughter. 
 Sam Allen is Bree's stepson.
 Gabrielle has experienced the loss of a child four times:
 her first pregnancy ended in miscarriage when she fell down a flight of stairs,
 Libby Collins, biological mother of her adopted daughter Lily, decided to take her back,
 The Surrogacy ended in failure,
 And she let go of her biological daughter Grace Sánchez.
She is also the only main housewife who is not a grandmother by the series finale.
Gabrielle is the housewife with the most times changed hair colour, as her hair starts out dark brown (season 1, first half of season 2, season 3; episodes 10–23), lightens to medium brown with copper highlights (second half of season 2, seasons 6, 7 and 8). After season 2, Gabrielle seems to dye her hair light brown with blond streaks for the first nine episodes of season 3, with the exception of the episode Bang, (honey blond with blond highlights). In season 4, after changing back to dark brown in season 3, Gabrielle lightens her hair yet again to medium brown with blond highlights. At some point during the time jump between seasons 4 and 5, Gabrielle replaces her blond highlights for caramel. Despite wearing her hair straight most of the time during the first five seasons, she completely stops wearing them straight for seasons 6 and 7, and starts again during the end of season 8.

References

Television characters introduced in 2004
Desperate Housewives characters
Fictional models
Fictional characters from New York City
Fictional housewives
Fictional characters from Texas